Antonio De Blasio (born 5 September 1955 in Pécs) is a Hungarian politician and former Member of the European Parliament (MEP) with the Fidesz, part of the European People's Party and was a member of the European Parliament's Committee on Regional Development.

He became MEP on 31 July 2006, succeeding István Pálfi, who died on 15 July 2006.

Personal life
He is married and has two children, Roberta and Domenico. He lives in Pécs, Hungary.

See also
 2004 European Parliament election in Hungary

References

External links
 

1955 births
Living people
People from Pécs
Fidesz MEPs
MEPs for Hungary 2004–2009
Hungarian people of Italian descent